David S. Ishii (born July 26, 1955) is an American professional golfer of Japanese descent.

Early life 
Ishii grew up on the island of Kauai in Hawaii and graduated from Kauai High School. As a junior in high school, he won the Hawaii State High School Championship.

Amateur career 
Ishii played his collegiate golf at the University of Houston from 1974 to 1977. He won four individual events, was a member of the 1977 NCAA Championship team, and was a 1977 All-American.

Professional career 
He turned professional in 1979. He led the money list on the Japan Golf Tour in 1987. He has 14 victories on the Japan Golf Tour and is 13th on the career money list.

Ishii won the inaugural Kapalua Open in 1982 and also won the 1990 Hawaiian Open, a PGA Tour event. He was the second Hawaiian native to win the event, after Ted Makalena in 1966.

Ishii currently participates on the Japan Senior PGA Tour and opened Ishii Golf Studio in Honolulu, Hawaii.

Amateur wins
1977 Manoa Cup (Hawaii State Amateur Match Play Championship)
1978 Hawaii Amateur

Professional wins (20)

PGA Tour wins (1)

Japan Golf Tour wins (14)

*Note: The 1987 Golf Nippon Series was shortened to 36 holes due to weather.

Japan Golf Tour playoff record (3–5)

Other wins (4)
1980 Hawaii State Open
1982 Kapalua Open
1984 Hawaii State Open
1985 Hawaii State Open

Senior wins (1)
2017 Hawaii State Senior Open

Results in major championships

CUT = missed the half-way cut
"T" = tied

Results in The Players Championship

"T" indicates a tie for a place

Results in senior major championships

CUT = missed the halfway cut
Note: Ishii never played in The Tradition or the Senior Players Championship.

See also
List of golfers with most Japan Golf Tour wins

References

External links

American male golfers
Houston Cougars men's golfers
Japan Golf Tour golfers
Golfers from Hawaii
American sportspeople of Japanese descent
1955 births
Living people